Piscadera Bay (Dutch: Piscaderabaai) is a waterway and a neighbourhood in the Netherlands Antilles. It is situated at the western side of Otrobanda, in the southern part of Willemstad, the capital of the southern Caribbean island of Curaçao. It contains a fort of the same name, the Caribbean Marine Biological Institute, and several hotels. It has a small beach, as well as a vacation village and holiday resort, with tennis courts and casinos. Sint Anna Bay is nearby. In the 17th century, maps of Piscadera Bay showed it to be a popular locale for fishing, with over 400 different species noted.

History 
Three hills (Veerisberg, Evertzberg and the Seru Pretu) dominate the landscape around the bay. In the late 17th century, plantation Veeris owned by Anton Veeris was established around the bay. The plantations Raphaël and Klein Piscadera followed later. Fort Piscadera was constructed in the 1700s, and rebuilt in 1744. After the abolition of slavery in 1863, a village developed based on agriculture and fishery. In November 1930, the village was annexed by Willemstad. In the 1930s, employees of Royal Dutch Shell settled in the village as well as Lebanese businessmen. From the 1960s onwards, luxury holiday resorts developed along the coast.

Landmarks

Fort Piscadera

In order to provide protection to Piscadera Bay, a fort was constructed on the cliffs overlooking the bay in 1700s, however it fell into neglect. The fort was restructed in 1744. It was seized by the British army in 1804 for a week in order to bombard Willemstad. This attack was unsuccessful and the invading troops were forced to leave the fort. By the 1950s, it had disappeared in the vegetation, and it was decided to restore the fort. The fort is in a dilapidated state in the precincts of the Curaçao Resort.

Research
In 1955, the head of the Petroleum Industry in Curaçao proposed funding for setting up of a scientific institution on the Piscadera Bay as it was found to be a perfect location for research, and then plans were prepared to establish the institution. The research station, known as the Caribbean Marine Biological Institute (CARMABI) was soon established at the open end of the bay to conduct research in the field of ecology—fisheries in particular. Renamed Caribbean Research and Management of Biodiversity Foundation after a merger with National Parks Foundation of the Netherlands Antilles (STINAPA), but still referred to as CARMABI, or CARMABI Foundation, it is "the largest field station in the Southern Caribbean".

Commercial

One of the notable hotels overlooking Piscadera Bay is the Floris Suite Hotel. It contains 72 suites, each with their own patio. The hotel's open-air restaurant, Sjalotte, serves Mediterranean cuisine. The Hilton Curaçao Resort, set in  gardens, contains 197 rooms and a  Las Vegas-style casino, with three restaurants, its own brewery, and a dive centre. The luxury five-star four-diamond Marriott Beach Resort and Emerald Casino contains 237 rooms and 10 suites, and like the Hilton contains a casino to attract American tourists. The Marriott also has a dive centre and a water bar serving drinks. Other seaside landmarks are a convention and trade center, as well as the recreational area of Koredor.

References

Bibliography
 

Geography of Curaçao
Willemstad
Populated places in Curaçao